This is a list of all hat-tricks scored during ASEAN Football Federation Championship; that is, the occasions when a footballer has scored three or more goals in a single football AFF Championship match. There have been 20 hat-tricks scored in the 13 editions of the AFF Championship tournament.

The first hat-trick was scored by K. Sanbagamaran of Malaysia playing against the Philippines in the 1996 AFF Championship; the most recent was by Bienvenido Marañón of Philippines, scoring thrice against Myanmar in the 2020 AFF Championship.

Indonesian Bambang Pamungkas became the first player to get two hat-tricks in a single competition and the first player to score four goals in a single match. His teammate Zaenal Arief also scored 4 goals in that very same match beating the Philippines 13-1. Vietnamese Phan Thanh Bình, Singaporean Noh Alam Shah and Thai Adisak Kraisorn are the other three players that have scored more than three goals.

Noh Alam Shah of Singapore and Kraisorn are the only players who have scored a double hat-trick in a single match, with Alam Shah scoring a record seven goals. He also became the first player to get a hat-trick in two consecutive tournaments. The fastest hat-trick was scored by Sarayuth Chaikamdee of Thailand who did it within four minutes.

List

References 

Hat-tricks
AFF Championship
AFF Championship